The George Mason Patriots are the intercollegiate athletic teams representing George Mason University (GMU), located in Fairfax, Virginia. The Patriots compete in Division I of the National Collegiate Athletic Association (NCAA) as members of the Atlantic 10 Conference for most sports.

History
The Patriots began to move from NAIA and NCAA Division II status into the NCAA Division I ranks with men's basketball in the 1978–1979 season. According to the History of George Mason basketball, both the men's and women's basketball program have been fixtures of campus life. Within a few years, all other sports also were elevated to Division I status. George Mason reached its current level of 20 varsity sports with the addition of women's lacrosse (1993–1994), women's rowing (1997–1998) and men's and women's swimming & diving (1999–2000). In addition, George Mason has fielded a varsity club football team since 1993 that competes intercollegiately. Their opponents range from other club teams to NCAA Division I FCS programs. GMU was a founding member of the CAA but joined the Atlantic 10 in 2013.

Sports sponsored

Men's basketball 

While many of the schoolʼs athletic programs have had historical seasons, the men's basketball program remains the flagship sport at the university. The menʼs basketball team has played at the Patriot Center since 1985 after playing prior seasons in the PE Building on the west side of the Fairfax Campus. The menʼs basketball team has made the NCAA tournament six times (1989, 1999, 2001, 2006, 2008, and 2011) and the NIT tournament four times (1986, 2002, 2004 and 2009). The Patriot basketball team is most famous for its 2006 NCAA run to the Final Four. GMU beat perennial powers UNC, Connecticut, and Michigan State, as well as a highly ranked Wichita State team, before losing to eventual National Champion Florida in the Final Four.

The programʼs largest rivals include conference foes George Washington and Virginia Commonwealth. New rivalries are forming via George Masonʼs admission to the A-10.

The best-known player in Patriots history is George Evans, a Gulf War veteran who played from 1997 to 2001 and was a CAA player of year three consecutive seasons.  He shares the CAA record with NBA legend David Robinson for winning the award three straight times. Other Patriot standouts include Andre Gaddy, Carlos Yates, Kenny Sanders, Curtis McCants, Nate Langley, Robert Dykes, Robert Rose, Jason Miskiri, Jai Lewis, Lamar Butler, Tony Skinn, Gabe Norwood, Folarin Campbell, and Will Thomas.

Men's soccer 

Men's soccer was one of the first varsity sports to be offered when the then George Mason College began its athletic program in the late 1960s.  Since then, it has become one of the most successful programs among the 22 NCAA Division I sports currently offered.  In the 39-year history of George Mason soccer, the program has a record of 377-264-76 for a winning percentage of .579. The Patriots have posted at least 10 victories in 23 of those seasons,
including 14 in a row from 1980 to 1993, and they have finished a season nationally ranked nine times (1981, '82, '84, '85, '87, '88, '90, '92 and '96) in the last 24 years. At George Mason Stadium, the team's 5,000-seat home field which opened for the 1982 season, the Patriots have a record of 140-61-26 (.674 winning percentage). The men's team has reached the NCAA Men's Division I Soccer Championship eight times (1985, '86, '87, '89, '90, '96, 2006 and 2008).  Notable former players include Joe Addo, Denis Hamlett, Ritchie Kotschau, Bob Lilley, Tamir Linhart, Anthony Noreiga, John O'Hara, Mark Pulisic, Conor Shanosky, John Borrajo, Irad Young, Taylor Washington, and Brent Brockman.

George Mason won the A-10 conference championship their first year in the league (2013).

Women's soccer 
Women's soccer has been perhaps the most successful program at George Mason University. The Patriots have reached the NCAA Division 1 Women's Soccer Championship twelve times and the College Cup four times (1983, '85, '86, '93), in 1983 they reached the final but would lose 4–0 to North Carolina.  Under Coach Hank Leung, the Patriots would again reach the final in the 1985 tournament, on Nov. 24, in front of a record-crowd of 4,500 people at George Mason Stadium and millions on national television on an ESPN broadcast, No. 3 George Mason would beat No. 2 North Carolina 2–0 to win the school's first ever National Championship in their history. GMU players Pam Baughman and Betsy Drambour won the Most Outstanding Player and Most Outstanding Defensive Player awards respectively while another GMU player, Lisa Gmitter, being the tournament's top scorer with 3 goals.

Track and field

Notable athletes

Club sports

In addition to its NCAA Division I sports, George Mason fields club teams in the following sports:

Bowling
Crew
Baseball (club)
Equestrian
Fencing
Field hockey
Football (Varsity Club)
Ice hockey
Lacrosse (club)
Rugby
Soccer (club)
Swimming (club)
Synchronized swimming
Tennis
Trap and skeet
Ultimate
Underwater hockey
Men's volleyball
Inline hockey

Championships and titles

National Championships
The Patriots have won 2 NCAA team championships, 23 George Mason student-athletes have claimed 35 individual national championships, and 13 George Mason teams have made more than 117 NCAA postseason appearances since the school opened.

Men's
Indoor Track and Field  (1): 1996

Women's
Soccer  (1): 1985

NCAA Tournament appearances

Men's
 Basketball (6), 1989, 1999, 2001, 2006, 2008, 2011
 Volleyball (4), 1984, 1985, 1988, 2016
 Soccer (8)
 Baseball

Women's
 Soccer
 Volleyball

Colonial Athletic Association titles
Mason athletes have captured 280 individual CAA championships.

Men's
 Baseball (2)
 Basketball (4) Regular Season Championships and (4) Conference Tournament Championships
 Soccer (4)
 Track & field (6)
 Wrestling (5)

Women's
 Cross Country (4)
 Soccer (1)
 Swimming & Diving (4)
 Track & Field (9) (all consecutive from 1990 to 1998)
 Volleyball (7, including 5 in a row from 1992 to 1996)

Atlantic 10 titles
Mason has captured 10 team A-10 championships.

Men's
 Soccer (1) 2013
 Baseball (1) 2014
 Cross Country (1) 2014
 Indoor Track & Field (2) 2017, 2019
 Outdoor Track & Field (2) 2015, 2016, 2019
Swimming and Diving (1) 2020

Women's
 Indoor Track & Field (1) 2014
 Outdoor Track & Field (2) 2014, 2015,2019

References

External links